John Thomas Irwin (April 24, 1940 – December 20, 2019) was an American poet and literary critic. He was the Decker Professor in the Humanities and Professor in The Writing Seminars and the English Department at Johns Hopkins University.

Background
Irwin was born in Houston, Texas, and received his bachelor's degree in English at the University of St. Thomas in Houston. Following a stint in the US Navy, he received his Master's degree and PhD in English from Rice University. He began his teaching career as an assistant professor in the English department at Johns Hopkins University in 1970, but  left Johns Hopkins in 1974 to become the editor of The Georgia Review at the University of Georgia. Dr. Irwin returned to Johns Hopkins to become professor and chair of The Writing Seminars department.  After that, he accepted a joint appointment in the English department and received an endowed chair, the Decker Professorship in the Humanities, in 1984.

Publications
Irwin's first book of literary criticism, Doubling and Incest/Repetition and Revenge: A Speculative Reading of Faulkner, was published by the Johns Hopkins University Press in 1975.  This was followed by his first book of poems, The Heisenberg Variations, under his pen name John Bricuth, published by the University of Georgia Press in 1976.

In 1980 he published his second book of literary criticism and scholarship, American Hieroglyphics: The Symbol of the Egyptian Hieroglyphics in the American Renaissance, with the Yale University Press, and in 1994 he published his third book of criticism, Mystery to a Solution: Poe, Borges. and the Analytical Detective Story, with the Johns Hopkins University Press. The latter book won the Christian Gauss Prize from Phi Beta Kappa for the best scholarly book in the humanities published in 1994 and also won the Aldo Scaglione Prize in comparative literature from the Modern Language Association for the best scholarly book published in the field of comparative literature that year.

His latest book, a narrative poem published by Johns Hopkins University press in 2005, is titled, As Long As It's Big.

Chess 
Irwin was a noted chess aficionado, with a "prodigious memory for chess."  The US national senior chess championship is named in his honor.

Partial bibliography
Academic 
Doubling and Incest/Repetition and Revenge: A Speculative Reading of Faulkner (Baltimore, MD: Johns Hopkins University Press, 1975). 
American Hieroglyphics: The Symbol of the Egyptian Hieroglyphics in the American Renaissance (New Haven, CT: Yale University Press, 1980). 
The Mystery to a Solution: Poe, Borges, and the Analytical Detective Story (Baltimore, MD: Johns Hopkins University Press, 1994). 
Unless the Threat of Death Is Behind Them: Hard-Boiled Fiction and Film Noir (Baltimore, MD: Johns Hopkins University Press, 2006). 
Hart Crane's Poetry: Appollinaire Lived in Paris, I Live in Cleveland, Ohio (Baltimore, MD: Johns Hopkins University Press, 2011).
F. Scott Fitzgerald's Fiction: An Almost Theatrical Innocence (Baltimore, MD: Johns Hopkins University Press, 2014).
Reviews 
T. Irwin, John T., "The Crisis of Regular Forms" [Review of On the Edge of the Knife by Charles Edward Eaton; Birth and Copulation and Death by Harry Morris; Coat on a Stick by Rolfe Humphries; The Geography of Lograire by Thomas Merton; New and Selected Poems by David Wagoner; The World Before Us: Poems 1950-70 by Theodore Weiss], The Sewanee Review, Vol. 81, No. 1 (Winter, 1973), pp. 158–171. 
 
Poetry 
Irwin, John T. (as John Bricuth), The Heisenberg Variations (Georgia: University of Georgia Press, 1976). 
Irwin, John T. (as John Bricuth), Just Let Me Say This About That, Sewanee Writers' Series (New York: Overlook Press, 1998). 
Irwin, John T. (Ed.), Words Brushed by Music: Twenty-Five Years of the Johns Hopkins Poetry Series (Johns Hopkins: Poetry and Fiction, Foreword by Anthony Hecht (Baltimore, MD: Johns Hopkins University Press, 2004). 
Irwin, John T. (as John Bricuth), As Long As It's Big: A Narrative Poem (Baltimore, MD: Johns Hopkins University Press, 2005).

References

1940 births
2019 deaths
American academics of English literature
University of St. Thomas (Texas) alumni
Rice University alumni
University of Georgia faculty
Johns Hopkins University faculty
Edgar Allan Poe scholars
American male non-fiction writers